The Laxmi Narsimha Temple is a Hindu temple dedicated to Lord Narasimha, an Avatar of Vishnu, located in western India, in Pune district of the state of Maharashtra. The temple is located at the confluence of Bhima river and Nira river, at the south eastern tip of Pune district, in Indapur taluka. Shri Narsimha of Nira Narsingpur is the family deity of many people from Maharashtra the prominent ones being the families of the previous Chief Minister of Maharashtra, Shri Devendra Fadnavis, Vinchurkar family, Argade family, Kakade family, Devale family and the Mitragotri family.

Architecture and history 
The Temple is located at the ghat at confluence of Bhima river and Nira river. The construction of the ghat was completed in 1527. The current structure of the temple was built in 1787 with the help of Sardar Vitthal Shivdev Dani at a cost of about £45,000 (Rs. 4,50,000).

The temple has been built in Peshwa architectural style in black stone. It took approximately twenty years for the completion of construction of the temple. There are three main doors facing towards East, North and West. The western door is fortified like Shaniwar Wada and has thirty three steps leading up to the temple. There are two murtis of Shri Narasimha in the main temple, one is made of sand and the other of black stone. Original murti was replaced by a duplicate one due to the fear of Aurangzeb.

There is a big bell located near the west door. This bell was originally a church bell located at the Portuguese church of Vasai. In the year 1739, Bajirao Peshwa's younger brother Chimaji Appa captured Vasai from the Portuguese Empire and took the four church bells to Pune. One of the bells was brought to the temple by Diwan Sadashiv Mankeshwar who was the inamdar of Tembhurni village.
 
There are several small temples located in the complex. They are of Shri Laxmi, Bhakt Prahlad, Ganesh, Shri Dattatreya, Bhimashankar, Vitthal Rukmini, Raghavendra Tirtha, Shakambhari, Kashi Vishweshwar, Bhairava and Rameshwar.

Festivals 
Vaisakha Navratri is the biggest festival celebrated at the temple. The festival starts on the sixth day of the month of Vaisakha and ends on fourteenth day which is Narasimha Jayanti. A procession of Shri Narasimha's paduka is taken out on the fifteenth day followed by Dahi Handi on the next day. The festival is marked by Pravachan, Bhajan, Kirtan and Indian classical music concerts.

Similar Temples: Pimpalkhunte (पिंपळखुंटे)

References 

Narasimha temples
Purana temples of Vishnu
Hindu temples in Pune district